Esteban Daniel Obregón (born 24 October 2001) is an Argentine professional footballer who plays as an attacking midfielder for Nueva Chicago, on loan from Estudiantes.

Career
Obregón started his career with Estudiantes. Having progressing through their youth system, the attacking midfielder made the breakthrough into their first-team in 2020 under caretaker managers Leandro Desábato and Rodrigo Braña. After going unused on the substitutes' bench against Aldosivi on 31 October, Obregón made his senior debut on 7 November by coming off the bench for Martín Cauteruccio in a defeat away to San Lorenzo. In February 2022, Obregón joined Primera Nacional side Guillermo Brown on a one-year loan deal.

In January 2023, he joined Primera Nacional side Nueva Chicago on a one-year loan deal. He made his debut at a  1-1 away tie against All Boys on 3 February 2023.

Personal life
In October 2020, it was announced that Obregón had tested positive for COVID-19 amid the pandemic; he was asymptomatic. He subsequently tested negative two weeks later.

Career statistics
.

Notes

References

External links

2001 births
Living people
People from La Plata Partido
Argentine footballers
Association football midfielders
Estudiantes de La Plata footballers
Guillermo Brown de Puerto Madryn footballers
Nueva Chicago footballers
Argentine Primera División players
Primera Nacional players